Kevin Rogers may refer to:

 Kevin Rogers (American football) (born 1951), American football coach and former player
 Kevin Rogers (baseball) (born 1968), former Major League Baseball pitcher
 Kevin Rogers (footballer) (born 1963), Welsh former footballer

See also
Kevin Rodgers (disambiguation)